Sebastian Hämer (born 17 March 1979 in Prerow) is a German singer and songwriter.

Discography

Albums

Solo singles

Featured in

References

1979 births
Living people
21st-century German male singers
Participants in the Bundesvision Song Contest